Battling Orioles is a 1924 American silent comedy film directed by Fred Guiol and Ted Wilde and starring Glenn Tryon, Blanche Mehaffey, and John T. Prince.

Synopsis
When a young barber's girlfriend is effectively kidnapped by dishonest owner of a nightclub, he enlists the help of his father and his old professional baseball teammates to rescue her.

Cast
 Glenn Tryon as Tommy Roosevelt Tucker 
 Blanche Mehaffey as Hope Stanton 
 John T. Prince as 'Cappy' Wolfe 
 Noah Young as Sid Stanton 
 Sam Lufkin as Jimmy 
 Robert Page as Inspector Joslin

References

Bibliography
 Munden, Kenneth White. The American Film Institute Catalog of Motion Pictures Produced in the United States, Part 1. University of California Press, 1997.

External links

1924 films
1924 comedy films
Silent American comedy films
Films directed by Fred Guiol
Films directed by Ted Wilde
American silent feature films
1920s English-language films
Pathé Exchange films
American black-and-white films
1920s American films
English-language comedy films